Kleptotrichy is the stealing of mammal hair by birds for use in their nests.

The phenomenon was first defined scientifically in a journal article published in July 2021. Scientists largely studied it from videos posted to YouTube.

References

Bird behavior